The Centre for Medieval Studies in Prague (CMS) is  a joint workplace of the Czech Academy of Sciences and Charles University located in Jilská 1 in the Old Town of Prague near St. Giles' Church. The Centre provides a platform for cooperation in advanced research and post-graduate studies between the two founding institutions in fields dealing with the Middle Ages – especially in areas transgressing the boundaries of traditional disciplines – and gaining the necessary contact with international research. The Centre for Medieval Studies is engaged in fundamental research as part of grant projects in medieval studies, and organizes events to support the scientific education of doctoral candidates.

History and activities 

The centre was established in 1998 thanks to the efforts of František Šmahel and Petr Sommer. The Centre for Medieval Studies is technically a specialized departement of the Institute of Philosophy of the Czech Academy of Sciences. The Institute (via the Academy) provides the Centre with its basic budget, though most of CMS’s funding comes from grants and project financing. The remainder of its budget, covering the costs of doctoral students, is contributed by Charles University’s Faculty of Arts.

The main objective of the Centre for Medieval Studies as laid down by its statute is to provide highly-qualified support to doctoral and post-graduate students in all disciplines of the Medieval Studies, from general history to medieval archaeology, the auxiliary historical sciences, legal history, the history of philosophy, theology, literary history, and the art history, as well as in specialist philological and other disciplines.

A no less serious responsibility of the Centre is represented by research and publication projects of an interdisciplinary nature, necessitating the pulling together of top professionals, specialised equipment and financial resources. It organises internal meetings and workshops with guests from tge Czech Republic and abroad, and meetings for young scholars with an interdisciplinary orientation towards unconventional projects and approaches to research, namely the Annual Meeting of Doctoral Students (one-day gathering held at the Academic Conference Centre in Prague providing the opportunity to present colleagues with a report on their work, and to test their presentation abilities while discussing academic topics) and the Summer School of Medieval Studies (held during the first weekend of September in Sázava Monastery, offering doctoral students practical seminars and thematic lecture blocks, a section to present their own projects, and a keynote lecture from a significant medievalist). The Centre also offers two annual, two-week-long research fellowships in cooperation with the Hus Museum Association, and the University of Constance.

The Centre for Medieval Studies owns a highly-specialized and constantly-expanding library equipped with editions of sources and scholarly literature, amounting to some 9,000 volumes. The library is open to all interested students and researchers. The Centre runs the Czech Medieval Sources online project which makes available editions of primary sources important for Czech medieval history for internet users. Since 2009, it publishes Studia Mediaevalia Bohemica (SMB), a biannual journal open to scholarly contributions in all fields related to the Middle Ages in Central Europe written in Czech, Slovak, English, German, Polish, or French.

Directors 

 František Šmahel (1998–2004)
 Petr Sommer (2004–?)
 Pavel Soukup (current)

References

External links
 Centre for Medieval Studies (official website in English)

Czech Academy of Sciences
Medieval studies research institutes
Charles University
1998 establishments in the Czech Republic